The Propeller Group is a cross-disciplinary structure for creating art projects. The collective is headquartered in Ho Chi Minh City, Vietnam and works in conjunction with creative individuals in Los Angeles, California, United States.

About 

The Propeller Group was founded in late 2006 by visual artists Phunam Thuc Ha (born 1974, Ho Chi Minh City, Vietnam) and Tuan Andrew Nguyen (born 1976, Ho Chi Minh City, Vietnam), who were joined by Matt Lucero (born 1976, Upland, California) in 2008. Phunam studied sculpture and conservation in Bangkok and Chiang Mai, Thailand and at the Hanoi College of Fine Arts. Nguyen earned a BFA from the University of California, Irvine. He met Lucero while they were completing their MFA from the California Institute of the Arts. Lucero earned a BFA from the University of California, Riverside. As of late 2017, Phunam Thuc Ha and Matt Lucero are no longer active members of The Propeller Group having withdrawn to pursue more personal interests. Tuan Andrew Nguyen continues to work with the group. Whereas his own practice focuses on 'memory and its potential for political resistance', Nguyen's work with The Propeller Group explores 'the memory of the Cold War and its residual effects on how we perceive and how we relate to one another in the present day'.

The collective is dedicated to developing original creative content, bridging between fine art and mainstream media. The group draws inspiration from television, film, video, and the Internet. They make large-scale collaborative projects in new media, from online viral campaigns, international film productions, television commercials, to art installations, and everything in between, taking a special interest in multimedia and mass communication. The collective employs strategies from advertising, marketing, and the rarefied forms of commodity exchange and display that take place in galleries and museums. Their medium and Vietnam are frequently their subjects. They use mass media as a platform to combine seemingly contradictory phenomena: advertising and politics, history and future, and public and private. They often push their work back into the public sphere, using commodities as a form of public art. The collective cites graffiti as a source of influence, as seen in their documentary Spray It Don't Say It (2006), which follows the evolution of graffiti in Vietnam. The influence of graffiti is also present in Television Commercial for Communism (2011), drawing inspiration from the COST REVS tag, which mixes identity with advertising and branding and takes advantage of the public space.

TPG Films

The Propeller Group also functions as the full-service video production company TPG Films. In addition to making music videos for Vietnamese pop singers Thanh Bui, Hoàng Thùy Linh, Minh Hằng, Hồ Ngọc Hà, Phương Vy, Anh Khang, Liêu Anh Tuấn, and the occasional commercials, TPG Films has collaborated with Vietnamese American artist Dinh Q. Lê on multimedia installation projects. They also regularly team up with Danish art collective Superflex, co-producing short films and video installations. The distinction between The Propeller Group and TPG Films reflects the shifting relations between art and commerce.

Phunam and Nguyen also co-founded the artist-run, non-profit, alternative space Sàn Art (Ho Chi Minh City) along with Dinh Q. Lê and Tiffany Chung in 2007.

Works 

Their works have been described as a blend of aesthetics and culture, between fine arts and mainstream media, between art gallery and the media world, between high culture and low culture, with an interdisciplinary and border-crossing appeal, a fusion of two seemingly different concepts and ideologies, such as the blend of the tool of capitalism (advertising) and ideology of communism in their project Television Commercial for Communism. According to the Guggenheim Museum, "To appreciate the Propeller Group’s work is to enter an extended network of aesthetic and cultural production." The Propeller Group has been the subject of solo exhibitions at galleries and museums worldwide. Their work has been included in No Country: Contemporary Art for South and Southeast Asia at the Solomon R. Guggenheim Museum, New York and The Ungovernables, New Museum Triennial. The collective, under the identity TPG, has also exhibited at Museum of Modern Art, Hammer Museum, San Francisco Museum of Modern Art, Lombard Freid Gallery, Guangzhou Triennial, and Singapore Art Museum.

Films 

 Spray It Don't Say It (2006) – documentary film
 She Sells Seashells (2007) – short film, in collaboration with The Seashores
 Burning Car (2008) – short film, in collaboration with Superflex
 Flooded McDonald’s (2008) – short film, in collaboration with Superflex
 The Financial Crisis (2009) – video clips for television broadcast, in collaboration with Superflex
 Porcelain / Mảnh Ghép Cuộc Đời (2009) – three-part television mini-series, in collaboration with Superflex
 FADE IN: EXT. STORAGE – CU CHI – DAY (2010) – short film, in collaboration with Superflex
 The Guerillas of Cu Chi (2012) – short film
 Light and Belief (2012) – short documentary film, with Dinh Q. Lê
 The Living Need Light, The Dead Need Music (2014) – short film

Video art 

 The Farmers and the Helicopters (2006) (in collaboration with Dinh Q. Lê)
 Uh (2007)
 From Father to Son (2007) (in collaboration with Dinh Q. Lê)
 South China Sea Pishkun (2009) (in collaboration with Dinh Q. Lê)
 Modern Times Forever (2011) (in collaboration with Superflex)
 Erasure (2011) (in collaboration with Dinh Q. Lê)
 Television Commercial for Communism (2011)

Interdisciplinary projects 

 Temporary Public Gallery (2010): Renting out advertising space to curate artworks in public, the group attempts to challenge notions of public space, advertising, and public art in Vietnam as there are limitations of the public art due to control through different censorship bodies.
 Estranged Fruit (2011): A study in the application of political history and socio-political meaning through the introduction of one of America’s most famous protest song, Strange Fruit, into China’s growing rock scene, via Chinese punk rock & industrial metal band, VooDooKungFu. Estranged Fruit was displayed in its first iteration in Hong Kong at 1A Space as an installation.
 Vietnam the World Tour (2010–2012): A rogue anti-nation-rebranding campaign. It appropriates marketing language, graffiti strategies, and viral video platforms to re-associate a historically colonized and mediated national identity with an entirely new mediated history.
 Static Friction: Burning Rubber (2012): An attempt to discuss the larger issues of globalism, economy, industry, individuality, rebellion, violence and aesthetics with one simple act: the burnout. Single channel video, modified Honda Wave, photographs.
 Static Friction (2012): A five-part work, including 1967, Collision, The Dream, Portraits of Mechanical Reproduction, and Chasing Inertia.
 The History of the Future (2012): A two-part mold is shown in the gallery space along with an accompanying short film showing a series of packshots, inter-cut with a short documentary narrative of the artists’ journey to an unknown location to bury the sculpture. The GPS coordinates are kept in a steel safe rigged with a time-release mechanism, attached to a digital counter, counting down from 100 years, only to be unlocked when the counter reaches zero.

Selected exhibitions and screenings

See also 

 List of Vietnamese artists
 Video art
 New media art
 Multimedia art
 Contemporary art
 Pop art

References

External links 
 Lombard Freid Gallery (Artist Page)
 Official website (as The Propeller Group)
 Official website (as TPG Films)
 "Tuan Andrew Nguyen on Returning to Vietnam and Cofounding an Art Space" on San Francisco Museum of Modern Art
 Exhibition information on AsiaArt Archive 
 The Propeller Group on Lovely Stationery
 The Propeller Group on Artsy (website)

Multimedia artists
Video artists
Vietnamese artist groups and collectives